Count Aladár Andrássy de Csíkszentkirály et Krasznahorka (February 17, 1827 – April 2, 1903) was a Hungarian soldier and politician.

He participated in the Hungarian Revolution of 1848, serving as aide-de-camp to Lieutenant General Józef Bem. After the defeat he lived in emigration. He returned in 1865. He became Count (comes) of Gömör és Kis-Hont County. He was a member of the House of Magnates. Andrássy was awarded the Order of the Golden Fleece.

Family
His parents were Count Károly Andrássy, a politician and Countess Etelka Szapáry. His brothers were Gyula Andrássy Sr., Prime Minister of Hungary, Minister of Foreign Affairs of Austria-Hungary and painter and politician Manó Andrássy. He married Baroness Leontina Wenckheim de Wenckheim (1841–1921).

External links
 Andrássy Aladár rövid életrajza  

1827 births
1903 deaths
Hungarian politicians
Hungarian soldiers
Aladar
Military personnel from Budapest